Wilhelm Marius Bakke Steffensen (15 August 1889 – 26 July 1954) was a Norwegian gymnast who competed in the 1920 Summer Olympics. He was part of the Norwegian team, which won the gold medal in the gymnastics men's team, free system event. He was born in Aalesund, and represented the club Aalesunds TF.

References

1889 births
1954 deaths
Sportspeople from Ålesund
Norwegian male artistic gymnasts
Gymnasts at the 1920 Summer Olympics
Olympic gymnasts of Norway
Olympic silver medalists for Norway
Olympic medalists in gymnastics
Medalists at the 1920 Summer Olympics
20th-century Norwegian people